In Greek mythology, Deucalion or Deukalion (/dju:keɪli:ən/; Ancient Greek: Δευκαλίων τῆς Κρήτης), was a king of Crete. He was counted among the Argonauts and the Calydonian Hunters.

Family 
Deucalion was the eldest son of Minos either by Pasiphae or Crete and thus grandson of Zeus. He was the brother of Acacallis, Ariadne, Androgeus, Xenodice, Phaedra, Glaucus and Catreus. By Cleopatra, Deucalion fathered Idomeneus who succeeded him and led the kingdom into the Trojan War. He was also the father of Crete and of an illegitimate son Molus. In Diodorus' account, Deucalion and Molus were brothers and their sons Idomeneus and Meriones led the Cretans to Troy.

 "Minos’ sons, they say, were Deucalion and Molus, and to Deucalion was born Idomeneus and to Molus was born Meriones. These two joined with Agamemnon in the expedition against Ilium with ninety ships..."

Mythology

Theseus in Crete 
It is said that when Theseus was about to leave Crete, he joined battle with the Cretans at the gate of the Labyrinth where he slew Deucalion and his bodyguard.

"And when Deucalion, his son [i.e. Minos], who was on hostile terms with the Athenians, sent to them a demand that they deliver up Daedalus to him, and threatened, if they refused, to put to death the youth whom Minos had received from them as hostages, Theseus made him a gentle reply, declining to surrender Daedalus, who was his kinsman and cousin.." "Then joining battle with them at the gate of the Labyrinth, he [i.e. Theseus] slew Deucalion and his body-guard.

One source recounts a different relationship between Deucalion and Theseus:

While he [i.e. Deucalion] was ruler of Crete, formed an alliance with the Athenians and united his own sister Phaedra in marriage to Theseus.

Odysseus' lie 
Odysseus pretends to be his second son Aethon when he speaks to his wife while in disguise. It is unclear whether Aethon is a real son of Deucalion, left by Idomeneus to act as regent during the war, or invented by Odysseus.

Notes

References

 Apollodorus, The Library with an English Translation by Sir James George Frazer, F.B.A., F.R.S. in 2 Volumes, Cambridge, MA, Harvard University Press; London, William Heinemann Ltd. 1921. ISBN 0-674-99135-4. Online version at the Perseus Digital Library. Greek text available from the same website.
Diodorus Siculus, The Library of History translated by Charles Henry Oldfather. Twelve volumes. Loeb Classical Library. Cambridge, Massachusetts: Harvard University Press; London: William Heinemann, Ltd. 1989. Vol. 3. Books 4.59–8. Online version at Bill Thayer's Web Site
 Diodorus Siculus, Bibliotheca Historica. Vol 1-2. Immanel Bekker. Ludwig Dindorf. Friedrich Vogel. in aedibus B. G. Teubneri. Leipzig. 1888-1890. Greek text available at the Perseus Digital Library.
 Gaius Julius Hyginus, Fabulae from The Myths of Hyginus translated and edited by Mary Grant. University of Kansas Publications in Humanistic Studies. Online version at the Topos Text Project.
 Lucius Mestrius Plutarchus, Lives with an English Translation by Bernadotte Perrin. Cambridge, MA. Harvard University Press. London. William Heinemann Ltd. 1914. 1. Online version at the Perseus Digital Library. Greek text available from the same website.
 Smith, William; Dictionary of Greek and Roman Biography and Mythology, London (1873). "Deuca'lion" 2.

Argonauts
Princes in Greek mythology
Kings of Crete
Kings in Greek mythology
Characters in the Odyssey
Cretan characters in Greek mythology